Polygrammodes auropurpuralis is a moth in the family Crambidae. It was described by Paul Dognin in 1903. It was found in Ecuador.

References

Spilomelinae
Moths described in 1903
Moths of South America